This is a list of members of the Western Australian Legislative Council from 22 May 1940 to 21 May 1944. The chamber had 30 seats made up of ten provinces each electing three members, on a system of rotation whereby one-third of the members would retire at each biennial election.

On 16 January 1942, the Governor assented to the Legislative Council (Postponement of Election) Act 1941 (No. 50 of 1941), which extended the terms of all Councillors whose terms expired on 21 May 1942. This was done, in the words of the Act's preamble, due to the "pressing national emergency arising out of the war with Japan in which the Commonwealth of Australia is presently engaged". Later amendments fixed the date as 21 May 1944, and extended all other Councillors' terms by two years.

Notes
 On 16 September 1941, Metropolitan Province Nationalist MLC John Nicholson died. James Hislop, one of the Nationalist candidates, won the resulting by-election on 1 November 1941.
 On 25 April 1942, North Province Independent MLC Joseph Holmes died. Independent candidate Cyril Cornish won the resulting by-election on 13 June 1942.
 On 16 May 1942, Metropolitan-Suburban Province Nationalist MLC James Macfarlane died. Unendorsed Nationalist candidate Frank Gibson won the resulting by-election on 11 July 1942.

Sources
 
 
 

Members of Western Australian parliaments by term